Ivana Jorović was the defending champion but lost in the first round to Sabina Sharipova.

Ekaterina Alexandrova won the title, defeating Richèl Hogenkamp in the final, 6–2, 6–7(3–7), 6–3.

Seeds

Draw

Finals

Top half

Bottom half

References
Main Draw

Engie Open de Seine-et-Marne - Singles